Chiajarjapata (possibly from Aymara ch'iyara black, k'ark'a crevice, fissure, crack, pata step, "black crevice step") is a  mountain in the Vilcanota mountain range in the Andes of Peru. It is located in the Puno Region, Carabaya Province, Corani District. Chiajarjapata Pata lies southeast of Macho Ritti, Tocra and Ananta near a lake named Mancacocha.

References 

Mountains of Peru
Mountains of Puno Region